The Ellijay River is a  river in Georgia. It ends in the town of Ellijay at its confluence with the Cartecay River, forming the Coosawattee River in Gilmer County.

See also
List of rivers of Georgia

References 

USGS Hydrologic Unit Map - State of Georgia (1974)

Rivers of Georgia (U.S. state)
Rivers of Gilmer County, Georgia